Sarah Sherman (born March 7, 1993), also known professionally as Sarah Squirm, is an American comedian, actress, and screenwriter. Sherman is known for using surreal and body horror comedy. She became a featured player on the NBC sketch comedy series Saturday Night Live starting with its 47th season in October 2021.

Early life
Sherman was born and raised on Long Island, New York, in a Jewish family. 

She graduated from Great Neck South High School and Northwestern University in 2014 with a degree in theater.

Career
Sherman developed an interest in stand-up comedy after she didn’t make the improv team at Northwestern. After graduating, she decided to stay in Chicago, befriending comedians like Megan Stalter and had a monthly show called Helltrap Nightmare along with Luke Taylor, David Brown, Wyatt Fair, and Scott Egleston.

Sherman began performing under her stage name "Sarah Squirm" which was inspired by a high school nickname. She was also getting booked as a comedian alongside noise musicians as she had friends that ran a record label.

In 2018, she made her television debut in an Adult Swim infomercial titled Flayaway.

In 2019, Sherman opened for fellow comedian Eric André on his Legalize Everything tour. She had also been a writer for The Eric Andre Show, Three Busy Debras, and Magic for Humans.

Sherman was asked to audition for the long-running NBC sketch-comedy show Saturday Night Live after doing a stand-up set at the Just for Laughs festival. She had previously been asked to do some showcases for SNL producers and attempted some character-based work which according to her, "fucking sucked." She was subsequently cast as a featured player for its 47th season, alongside fellow newcomers James Austin Johnson and Aristotle Athari. Prior to getting hired on SNL, she had trouble finding employment due to her gross-out videos turning off hiring managers. 

Sherman has received praise from critics for adapting her unusual and surreal comedy style to SNL without losing its impact. Luka Katic of Collider wrote "Sherman certainly isn't the first unconventional comedian to be featured on SNL (i.e. Tim Robinson, Kyle Mooney, etc.). However, what makes her remarkable is her success in spite of that fact. Where actors like Robinson often felt they had to tone down their material for SNL, Sherman finds inventive alternative ways to channel her deranged sensibilities into the show." Jesse Hassenger of Vulture listed Sherman's "Meatballs" sketch from the Oscar Isaac/Charli XCX episode as one of the best of the season, writing "In a crowded season, it was especially refreshing to come upon a sketch that feels like such a clear expression of its star’s sensibilities."

In 2022, Sherman was credited as a screenwriter for the reality comedy film sequel Jackass Forever.

Sherman is set to star in the Adam Sandler comedy film for Netflix, You Are So Not Invited to My Bat Mitzvah, with Idina Menzel, Luis Guzmán, and Ido Mosseri.

Influences
Sherman has said her comedic influences include television shows such as Seinfeld, The Nanny, The Golden Girls, Pee-wee's Playhouse, and The Ren & Stimpy Show. She has cited Norm Macdonald as an influence on her SNL work: "He was a little troublemaker. I relate to him because he was never not himself." When she started performing stand-up comedy, she became influenced by comedians such as Todd Barry, Maria Bamford, and Kristen Schaal.

Political views
In 2020, Sherman supported Bernie Sanders as the Democratic candidate for the 2020 United States presidential election. She is also a member of the Democratic Socialists of America.

References

External links
 
 
 

1993 births
Living people
21st-century American actresses
21st-century American comedians
21st-century American Jews
21st-century American women
American sketch comedians
American stand-up comedians
American television actresses
American women comedians
American women screenwriters
American women television writers
Comedians from New York (state)
Jewish American actresses
Jewish American female comedians
Jewish American screenwriters
Jewish socialists
Members of the Democratic Socialists of America
New York (state) socialists
Northwestern University alumni
People from Long Island
William A. Shine Great Neck South High School alumni